This article documents statistics from the 2021 Rugby World Cup, held in New Zealand from 8 October to 12 November 2022.

As of: 5 November 2022

Team statistics

Individual statistics
Oldest player:
 Iliseva Batibasaga: 37 years, 169 days.

Youngest player:
 Sulila Waisega: 18 years, 204 days.

Most experienced player:
 Iliseva Batibasaga: 16 years, 12 days since debut (debut: 31 August 2006)

Least experienced player:
 Tania Naden: debut
 Maya Stewart: debut
 Marie Thibault: debut
 Raijieli Daveua: debut
 Siteri Rasolea: debut
 Akanisi Sokoiwasa: debut
 Iris Verebalavu: debut
 Joanna Grisez: debut
 Sofia Rolfi: debut
 Erica Jarell: debut
 Jett Hayward: debut

Most capped player:
 Sarah Hunter: 137 caps.

Least capped player:
 Tania Naden: 0 caps
 Maya Stewart: 0 caps
 Marie Thibault: 0 caps
 Raijieli Daveua: 0 caps
 Siteri Rasolea: 0 caps
 Akanisi Sokoiwasa: 0 caps
 Iris Verebalavu: 0 caps
 Joanna Grisez: 0 caps
 Sofia Rolfi: 0 caps
 Erica Jarell: 0 caps
 Jett Hayward: 0 caps

Tallest player:
 Jenny Kronish: 

Shortest player:
 Megumi Abe: .

Try scorers
7 tries

 Portia Woodman

6 tries

 Emily Tuttosi
 Amy Cokayne
 Marlie Packer

5 tries

 Ruby Tui

4 tries

 Paige Farries
 Abigail Dow
 Claudia MacDonald
 Connie Powell
 Joanna Grisez

3 tries

 Bienne Terita
 Rosie Galligan
 Marine Ménager
 Theresa Fitzpatrick
 Ayesha Leti-I'iga

2 tries

 Brianna Miller
 Mikiela Nelson
 Karen Paquin
 Alex Tessier
 Poppy Cleall
 Lydia Thompson
 Abbie Ward
 Émilie Boulard
 Maëlle Filopon
 Romane Ménager
 Laure Sansus
 Gabrielle Vernier
 Maria Magatti
 Aura Muzzo
 Vittoria Ostuni Minuzzi
 Sylvia Brunt
 Luka Connor
 Ruahei Demant
 Stacey Fluhler
 Renee Holmes
 Sarah Hirini
 Krystal Murray
 Maia Roos
 Amy Rule
 Renee Wickliffe
 Megan Gaffney
 Lana Skeldon
 Alev Kelter
 Joanna Kitlinski
 Sioned Harries

1 try

 Iliseva Batibasaga
 Emily Chancellor
 Ivania Wong
 Tyson Beukeboom
 Alysha Corrigan
 Olivia DeMerchant
 McKinley Hunt
 Sara Kaljuvee
 Zoe Aldcroft
 Shaunagh Brown
 Sarah Hunter
 Leanne Infante
 Alex Matthews
 Helena Rowland
 Emily Scarratt
 Lavena Cavuru
 Ilisapeci Delaiwau
 Sesenieli Donu
 Karalaini Naisewa
 Aloesi Nakoci
 Pauline Bourdon
 Annaëlle Deshayes
 Célia Domain
 Caroline Drouin
 Madoussou Fall
 Émeline Gros
 Gaëlle Hermet
 Mélissandre Llorens
 Laure Touyé
 Melissa Bettoni
 Elisa Giordano
 Megumi Abe
 Komachi Imaguki
 Kyoko Hosokawa
 Hinano Nagura
 Maki Takano
 Alana Bremner
 Chelsea Bremner
 Liana Mikaele-Tu'u
 Joanah Ngan-Woo
 Georgia Ponsonby
 Awhina Tangen-Wainohu
 Aseza Hele
 Nomawethu Mabenge
 Zintle Mpupha
 Elizabeth Cairns
 Jennine Detiveaux
 Jenny Kronish
 Hallie Taufo'ou
 Kate Zackary
 Alisha Butchers
 Ffion Lewis

Point scorers

Kicking accuracy

Hat-tricks

Discipline
In total, 3 red cards and 27 yellow cards have been issued during the tournament.

Yellow cards
2 yellow cards

 Shannon Parry (1 vs New Zealand, 1 vs England)
 Adiana Talakai (2 vs Scotland)
 Roela Radiniyavuni (2 vs France)
 Komachi Imaguki (1 vs United States, 1 vs Italy)

1 yellow card

 Grace Kemp (vs Wales)
 Ivania Wong (vs New Zealand)
 Emma Taylor (vs Italy)
 Zoe Aldcroft (vs Australia)
 Sarah Bern (vs South Africa)
 Victoria Cornborough (vs Canada)
 Safi N'Diaye (vs New Zealand)
 Sereima Leweniqila (vs England)
 Akanisi Sokoiwasa (vs South Africa)
 Maria Magatti (vs France)
 Vittoria Ostuni Minuzzi (vs United States)
 Silvia Turani (vs France)
 Sarah Hirini (vs Wales)
 Tanya Kalounivale (vs Scotland)
 Charmaine McMenamin (vs Wales)
 Santo Taumata (vs France)
 Kathryn Johnson (vs Japan)
 Alev Kelter (vs Canada)
 Nolusindiso Booi (vs England)
 Catha Jacobs (vs England)
 Nomawethu Mabenge (vs Fiji)
 Sizophila Solontsi (vs France)
 Cara Hope (vs Scotland)
 Jasmine Joyce (vs Scotland)
 Carys Williams-Morris (vs New Zealand)

Red cards
1 red card

 Ashley Marsters (vs Scotland) Head-on-head contact with Sarah Law.
 Adiana Talakai (vs Scotland) Double yellow card.
 Roela Radiniyavuni (vs France) Double yellow card.

References

statistics